Ernesto Pires Barreto de Lara Filho (1932–1977) was a revolutionary Portuguese Angolan writer and agronomist and brother of Angolan poet Alda Lara.

Born in Benguela in 1932, he was educated in Angola and Portugal before he began work as a journalist in Luanda in the 1950s. An outspoken supporter of Angolan independence, he was arrested by the Portuguese security agency PIDE for his revolutionary activities.

In his life Ernesto Lara Filho published several notable books and anthologies of poetry. He was also one of the founders of the Association of Angolan Writers after independence. He died in an automobile accident in 1977, at age 44.

See also
Portuguese Angolans
Alda Lara

References

Angolan writers
1932 births
1977 deaths
Angolan people of Portuguese descent
People from Benguela